Ashburn is a station on Metra's SouthWest Service in the community area of Ashburn, Chicago, Illinois. In Metra's zone-based fare system, Ashburn is in zone C. As of 2018, Ashburn is the 161st busiest of Metra's 236 non-downtown stations, with an average of 229 weekday boardings. There is an unstaffed shelter. There are no connecting bus services. The station is just west of an at-grade crossing with the Grand Trunk Railway (now owned by Canadian National through the Grand Trunk Corporation).

As of January 16, 2023, Ashburn is served by 27 trains (14 inbound, 13 outbound) on weekdays. Saturday service is currently suspended.

References

External links 

Station from 83rd Place from Google Maps Street View

Metra stations in Chicago
Railway stations in the United States opened in 2000
Former Wabash Railroad stations